My Music is an Albanian music television channel, part of DigitAlb . It transmits free to air on satellite in Europe via Eutelsat, and in terrestrial and cable in Albania .

References

Digitalb television networks
Music television channels
Television channels and stations established in 2004
Mass media in Tirana
Music organizations based in Albania